The Apostolic Prefecture of Weihai is a Latin Catholic pre-diocesan jurisdiction based in the port city of Weihai, Shandong province, northeastern China.

It is exempt, i.e., directly dependent on the Holy See and its missionary Roman Congregation for the Evangelization of Peoples.

History 
The  positions was established on 1931.06.18 as Mission sui juris of Weihai 威海 (中文) / Weihaiwei 威海衛 (中文) / Veihaiveien(sis) (Latin adjective), on territory split off from the then Apostolic Vicariate of Zhifou 芝罘 (meanwhile a Diocese) In 1938 it was promoted as Apostolic Prefecture of Weihai 威海 (中文) / Weihaiwei 威海衛 (中文) / Veihaiveien(sis) (Latin). It has remained vacant without an apostolic administrator (dormant) since 1970.

Ordinaries 
(all Latin Rite and Western members of a missionary Latin congregation)

Ecclesiastical Superior(s?) of Weihai mission sui iuris 
 not available

Apostolic Prefects of Weihai 威海 
 Father Louis-Prosper Durand, Friars Minor (O.F.M.) (born Canada) (1932.01.29 – 1938.06.14), later Titular Bishop of Sebela (1938.06.14 – 1946.04.11) as Apostolic Vicar of Zhifou 芝罘 (China) (1938.06.14 – 1946.04.11), Bishop of Yantai 煙台 (China) (1946.04.11 – retired 1950.01.20), emeritate as Titular Bishop of Girus (1950.01.20 – death 1972.08.07)
 Fr. Cesario Stern, O.F.M. (1939.06.02 – retired 1949.03.28), died 1957
 Fr. Edward Gabriel Quint, O.F.M. (1950.01.27 – retired 1970), died 1994
 Long vacancy

See also 
 List of Catholic dioceses in China

References

Sources and external links 
 GCatholic - data for all sections

Apostolic prefectures
Roman Catholic dioceses in China
Religion in Shandong
Weihai